Omaha Public Power District, or OPPD, is a public electric utility in the state of Nebraska. It is a publicly owned electric utility in the United States, serving more than 855,000 people in Omaha and 13 surrounding counties in southeast Nebraska. OPPD was formed in 1946 as a political subdivision of the State of Nebraska, taking over the operations of Nebraska Power Company (founded in 1917). A publicly elected eight-member Board of Directors sets rates and policies.

OPPD is headquartered in Omaha.

In the Summer of 2011, OPPD had its Nuclear Generating Station in Fort Calhoun shut down due to Missouri River flooding.  The station was shut down for an extended period of time by Federal NRC Regulators due to serious issues at the plant.  The plant started back up in December 2013.

Generating facilities

OPPD formerly operated the Fort Calhoun Nuclear Generating Station near Fort Calhoun.  After 42 years of operation (interrupted by flooding from 2011 to 2013), the plant was shut down on October 25, 2016 and is in the process of being decommissioned. OPPD operates other generating stations in North Omaha, Nebraska City, Valley, Elkhorn and in Cass County; coal, natural gas, oil, wind turbines, solar, and landfill gas are used to generate electricity at their power plants.

Awards
In 2012 OPPD was awarded its 12th J.D. Power and Associates award. OPPD was named "Highest in Customer Satisfaction among Midsize Utilities in the Midwest" in the J.D. Power and Associates 2009 Electric Utility Residential Customer Satisfaction Study.

Carbon emissions, alternative energy, and energy mix 
In December 2019, the board of the Omaha Public Power District voted to commit to net-zero emissions by 2050. A 400- to 600-megawatt solar array is planned, as is the closing of three gas fired power units, and conversion of two coal-burning units to natural gas.

References

External links
Omaha Public Power District

Government agencies established in 1946
Public Power District
Nuclear power companies of the United States
Power districts in Nebraska
Infrastructure in Omaha, Nebraska
Public utilities of the United States
1946 establishments in Nebraska